In mathematics, Fuchs' theorem, named after Lazarus Fuchs, states that a second-order differential equation of the form

That is, any solution to this second-order differential equation can be written as

for some positive real s, or

for some positive real r, where y0 is a solution of the first kind.

See also
 Frobenius method

References
 .
 .

Differential equations
Theorems in analysis